GW151226 was a gravitational wave signal detected by the LIGO observatory on 25 December 2015 local time (26 Dec 2015 UTC). On 15 June 2016, the LIGO and Virgo collaborations announced that they had verified the signal, making it the second such signal confirmed, after GW150914, which had been announced four months earlier the same year, and the third gravitational wave signal detected.

Event detection

The signal was detected by LIGO at 03:38:53 UTC, with the Hanford detector picking it up 1.1 milliseconds after the Livingston detector (since the axis between the two was not parallel to the wave front); it was identified by a low-latency search within 70s of its arrival at the detectors.

Astrophysical origin
The resulting merged black hole had  solar masses, one solar mass having been radiated away. In both of the first two black hole mergers analyzed, the mass converted to gravitational waves was roughly 4.6% of the initial total.

In this second detection, LIGO Scientific Collaboration and Virgo scientists also determined that at least one of the premerger black holes was spinning at more than 20% of the maximum spin rate allowed by general relativity. The final black hole was spinning with  times its maximum possible angular momentum. The black holes were smaller than in the first detection event, which led to different timing for the final orbits and allowed LIGO to see more of the last stages before the black holes merged—55 cycles (27 orbits) over one second, with frequency increasing from 35 to 450 Hz, compared with only ten cycles over 0.2 second in the first event.

The location/direction in the sky is poorly constrained. The signal was first seen at Livingston with delay of 1.1 (±0.3) ms later at LIGO Hanford.

Implications
The GW151226 event suggests that there is a large population of binary black holes in the Universe that will produce frequent mergers.

The measured gravitational wave is completely consistent with the predictions of general relativity for strong gravitational fields. The theory's strong-field predictions had not been directly tested before the two LIGO events. General relativity passed this most stringent test for the second time.

See also

Gravitational-wave astronomy

References

External links
LIGO News
LIGO Detection

2015 in science
2016 in science
2015 in space
2016 in space
Gravitational waves
Binary stars
Stellar black holes
Science and technology in Germany
Science and technology in Italy
Science and technology in the United States
December 2015 events